Harold Phipps (15 January 1916 – 2000) was an English professional footballer who played as a centre half.

Career
Born in Dartford, Phipps started his professional career during the Second World War, with Charlton Athletic. During the war he also made guest appearances for Chelsea and Fulham. Following the resumption of the Football League in 1946, Phipps made 185 league appearances for Charlton, scoring twice. He is perhaps better known for his appearances in the FA Cup; he was a losing finalist with Charlton in 1946, and was part of their cup-winning team in the following year's final. Phipps joined Watford in 1952, and went on to make 47 appearances in the Third Division South, scoring twice. He later player-managed non-league side Bexleyheath & Welling.

References

1916 births
2000 deaths
English footballers
Charlton Athletic F.C. players
Watford F.C. players
Bexley United F.C. players
English Football League players
Chelsea F.C. wartime guest players
Fulham F.C. wartime guest players
Association football defenders
FA Cup Final players